The Trieste Campo Marzio Railway Museum is a museum in Trieste (Italy), concerned with railway and tram transportation. It is housed in Trieste Campo Marzio railway station, the former Trieste Staatsbahnhof (earlier still known as the Sankt-Andrae-Bahnhof) during the Austro-Hungarian period and one of the two main terminal stations in Trieste.  the museum has been closed for renovation by the Fondazione FS (the heritage foundation of Ferrovie dello Stato Italiane).

General 
The museum, inaugurated on March 8, 1984, hosts historic rolling stock and locomotives on the five existing tracks of the former passenger station built by Austro-Hungarian government. Inside the station building the museum holds devices, signals and interlocking, as well as scale models
. It covers all the railways history of Trieste area from mid-19th century to mid-20th century: during this period the city and its nearby territory were part of different nations, as Austria-Hungary, Kingdom of Italy, Socialist Yugoslavia and Republican Italy.

Rolling stock 
The rolling stock  examples kept in the museum include:
 728.022, Lokomotivfabrik Floridsdorf 1921
 640.064 Società Italiana Ernesto Breda 1909
 Armoured car, former German Army
 683.015 locomotive, MÁVAG 1918
 Three tramway car, built in the 30s and 40s, and a tramway trailer
 Snowplow Vnx 806.201, former FS Class E550,  used on the Udine-Tarvisio line

References

External links 
The museum website, currently suspended.

Railway museums in Italy
Tram museums
1984 establishments in Italy
Museums established in 1984